Richard John McNeill Allinson (born 12 October 1958) is an English broadcaster with Greatest Hits Radio and Scala Radio and is Creative Director of Magnum Opus Broadcasting. Between 1997 and 2014 he was a disc jockey for BBC Radio 2.

Early career
Allinson was born in Lichfield, Staffordshire.  He attended Tudor Grange Grammar School for Boys in Solihull. He started his broadcasting with a 3-year stint at Bailrigg FM, known at that time as University Radio Bailrigg (URB), whilst studying for a BA Hons in Economics at Lancaster University. He was firstly Treasurer and then became President of URB. He rejected a career in the legal profession and, in August 1980, took up broadcasting on London's Capital Radio, presenting their Chart Show. He also presented the Early Breakfast show for some of this period. Following on from Capital's Chart Show, in 1984 he took over the late-night 10pmmidnight slot. In 1987 he took over the weekday 24:30pm slot, followed by the weekday Early Breakfast show 46:30am in 1990. In addition to this, in around 1994 he worked alongside Julia Carling on the satellite music television channel VH1, where they hosted a live show together.

Radio 2
Allinson joined BBC Radio 2 in 1997, presenting the MondayThursday late night show from 10:30pm to midnight, which included a mix of music and guests.

In early 1999, Allinson took over the weekday drivetime show from 5pm to 7pm whilst regular presenter Johnnie Walker was off air due to health-related issues. He presented the programme for several months, with Lynn Parsons taking over the late show; in December 1999, Allinson returned to the late night show.

In addition to his late night show, in 2000, Allinson also took over a Saturday afternoon show from 3:30 to 6:30pm, where he introduced the 'Radio Wall of Sound'. This was where listeners could ring in, listen to a selection of snippets of tunes until they liked one particularly, for it to play as quickly as they'd shouted 'play' or made some other noise dictated by the host after the caller had been probed about their life. They were rewarded with a CD album of their choice.

Allinson stepped down from the late night slot in June 2004, so he could concentrate on fronting Radio 2's 'Live & Exclusive' series and 'Sold on Song' projects. With record producer Steve Levine he formed Magnum Opus Broadcasting to "create programming and content we wanted to hear – but could not find – on the radio. Alongside this, he still continued with his Saturday afternoon show, which was cut down to 2 hours in September 2004 and went out from 4 to 6pm every Saturday.

It was also during this period that he became the main stand-in for many weekday presenters when taking their holidays, such as Chris Evans, Simon Mayo, Paul O'Grady, Terry Wogan, Ken Bruce, Sarah Kennedy and Steve Wright.

His Saturday show eventually ended in September 2005, but he still continued to stand in for weekday presenters on Radio 2 as well as create and present documentaries and specialist shows for the network, such as The Record Producers, which is usually broadcast from 7 to 8pm on Bank Holiday Mondays. On Sunday 24 August 2008 Allinson hosted London 2012 Party Live on BBC Radio 2 from The Mall outside Buckingham Palace in London which included the 2008 Beijing Olympics handover musical celebrations.

BBC Local Radio
From 8 January 2006 until 24 February 2007, Allinson presented a regular weekly show on BBC Radio Oxford on Sunday mornings from 9am to 12 noon. The show included a mix of music, guests, competitions and a look at headlines from the Sunday papers. Since January 2007, he has presented the two-hour live show Allinson's Albums between 12 and 2pm every Saturday on BBC Radio Oxford, and from 4 March 2007 is repeated on Sundays from 5 to 7pm (these are no longer broadcast). The show was also broadcast on BBC Radio York on Saturday lunchtimes from 1 to 3pm, and on BBC Radio Cumbria each Wednesday evening, repeated on Sunday afternoons; the last edition of this was broadcast on 6 January 2013.

Other work
Allinson has been heard on the various BFBS (British Forces) radio networks since 1980, first on Most Wanted for BFBS Radio 1, where he played mostly new music with a cutting edge, later moving to BFBS UK and others, and moved to BFBS Radio 2 in 2003 presenting in a style which the public have grown accustomed to with his shows on BBC Radio 2. From October 2006 he took over a daily show for the network, going out Mondays-Fridays from 9 to 11am UK time, which he presented until March 2008. Richard has also been known to present shows on the BBC World Service.

Return to Radio 2
From 2009, Allinson returned to BBC Radio 2 on a regular basis, presenting the weekend overnight slots, replacing Pete Mitchell and Mo Dutta's slots. The show went out on Friday nights/Saturday mornings and Saturday nights/Sunday mornings from 3 to 6am and was produced by production company Somethin' Else. He also presented an occasional series called The Record Producers, which went out on Bank Holiday Mondays. In October 2014 his weekend show was cancelled due to budget cuts at Radio 2. He hasn't done any cover work for Radio 2 since moving to Magic Radio.

Magic Radio
From 27 October 2014 to 9 April 2021 Allinson presented the weekday drivetime show, before taking on weekend evenings on Magic Radio. He presented his last show for Magic in March 2022.

Greatest Hits Radio and Scala
He joined Greatest Hits Radio on 26 February 2022, and has taken over Janice Long's Saturday afternoon slot from 1- 5pm. In addition to that, he has taken over the Monday to Thursday evening show from 7 – 10pm on Scala Radio.

Radio credits
 Capital London Chart Show, Sundays, 19801984
 Capital London Late Show, weekdays 10pmmidnight, 19841987
 Capital London Afternoon Show, weekdays 24:30pm, 19871990
 Capital London Early Breakfast Show, weekdays 57am, 19901997
 BBC Radio 2 Late Nights, MondayThursday 10:30pmmidnight, March 1997  June 2004
 BBC Radio 2 Saturday Afternoons, 3:306:30pm, April 2000  September 2004; 46pm September 2004  September 2005
 BBC Radio 2 Record Producers, (alongside Steve Levine) Bank Holiday Mondays 78pm, 20062012
 BBC Radio 2 Record Producers, ( alongside Steve Levine ) New Years Day 67pm, 2007
 BBC Radio Oxford Sunday Mornings, 9ammidday, January 2006  February 2007
 BBC Radio Oxford Allinson's Albums, Saturdays midday2pm, January 2007  May 2009
 BBC Radio York Allinson's Albums, Saturdays 13pm, May 20072013
 BBC Radio Cumbria Allinson's Albums Sundays, June 2008 – May 2009; Wednesdays and Sundays, June 2009  January 2013
 BBC Radio 2 Weekend Overnights Friday night/Saturday morning and Saturday night/Sunday morning, 36am, 2009  2014
 Magic Radio Weekday Drivetime, 58pm MondayFriday, 2014  2021
 Magic Radio Weekend Evenings, 710pm FridaySunday, 2021  March 2022
 Greatest Hits Radio Saturday Afternoons, 15pm Saturday, February 2022  present
 Scala Radio Monday to Thursday Evenings, 710pm. April 2022  present.

References

External links
Richard Allinson on Scala Radio
Mindfulness Classics with Richard Allinson on Scala Radio
Richard Allinson on Greatest Hits Radio
Anthems on Greatest Hits Radio

1958 births
English radio DJs
BBC Radio 2 presenters
Living people
Alumni of Lancaster University
Alumni of Fylde College, Lancaster
People from Lichfield